The 7th Tank Battalion "M.O. Di Dio" is an active unit of the Italian Army. During the Cold War it was based in Vivaro in Friuli Venezia Giulia. Originally the battalion, like all Italian tank units, was part of the infantry, but on 1 June 1999 it became part of the cavalry. Operationally the battalion was last assigned to the 8th Mechanized Brigade "Garibaldi". The unit was reactivated as on 4 October 2022.

History 
The battalion was formed during the 1975 army reform: on 31 October 1975 the 8th Bersaglieri Regiment was disbanded and the next day its VII Tank Battalion became the 7th Tank Battalion "M.O. Di Dio". As the war flag and traditions of the 8th Bersaglieri Regiment were assigned to the 3rd Bersaglieri Battalion "Cernaia" the 7th Di Dio was granted a new war flag on 12 November 1976 by decree 846 of the President of the Italian Republic Giovanni Leone. The battalion received the traditions of the VII Tank Battalion "M", which had been formed by the 32nd Tank Infantry Regiment on 30 January 1941. The battalion was sent to Italian Libya on 15 February 1941 to bolster Italian forces after the successful British Operation Compass. Initially the regiment served with the 32nd Tank Infantry Regiment, and from 1 September 1941 with the newly formed 132nd Tank Infantry Regiment. With the 132nd the battalion was heavily decimated during the British Operation Crusader, fighting battles at Bir el Gubi on 19 November and 4-7 December and for Point 175 before retreating West. The VII Tank Battalion was disbanded at the end of January 1942 to bring regiment's two remaining battalions back up to strength. For its service 132nd Tank Infantry Regiment was awarded a Gold Medal of Military Valour, which during the 1975 army reform passed with the 132nd regiment's flag to the 8th Tank Battalion "M.O. Secchiaroli" and was duplicated for the new flag of the 7th Tank Battalion "M.O. Di Dio".

After World War II the VII Tank Battalion was reformed in Aviano on 5 January 1959 as unit of the 132nd Tank Regiment, which transferred the battalion on 1 August 1963 to the 8th Bersaglieri Regiment.

Tank and armored battalions created during the 1975 army reform were all named for officers, soldiers and partisans, who were posthumously awarded Italy's highest military honor the Gold Medal of Military Valour for heroism during World War II. The 7th Tank Battalion's name commemorated 1st Tank Infantry Regiment Lieutenant Alfredo Di Dio, who, together with his brother Antonio Di Dio, formed one of the first partisan units in Piedmont after the German occupation of Italy in September 1943. Having already lost his brother on 13 February 1944 in a firefight with German forces, Alfredo Di Dio was killed in action on 12 October 1944. Equipped with M60A1 Patton main battle tanks the battalion joined the 8th Mechanized Brigade "Garibaldi", whose headquarters had been formed from the 8th Bersaglieri Regiment's headquarters.

For its conduct and work after the 1976 Friuli earthquake the battalion was awarded a Bronze Medal of Army Valour, which was affixed to the battalion's war flag and added to the battalion's coat of arms.

After the end of the Cold War the Italian Army reorganized its forces and on 1 July 1991 the Garibaldi brigade's headquarters moved to Caserta in the South of Italy. In expectation of the move the 7th Tank Battalion was disbanded a month earlier on 31 May 1991 and its flag transferred to the Shire of the Flags at the Vittoriano in Rome.

2022 Reactivation 
On 4 October 2022 the flag and traditions of the 7th Tank Battalion "M.O. Di Dio" were given to the Command and Tactical Supports Unit "Ariete" of the 132nd Armored Brigade "Ariete".

As of reactivation the unit is organized as follows:

  7th Tank Command and Tactical Supports Unit "M.O. Di Dio", in Pordenone
 Command Squadron
 Signal Company

See also 
 8th Mechanized Brigade "Garibaldi"

References

Tank Battalions of Italy